Bergensfjord is the name of several ships:
 , a ship used by the Norwegian America Line, 1913–1946
 , an ocean liner operated by the Norwegian America Line, 1955–1971
 , a passenger ferry renamed Oslofjord
 , a passenger ferry operated by Fjord Line between Mortavika and Arsvågen in Norway (Norwegian article)
 , a passenger ferry operated by Fjord Line

Ship names